Micranthocereus albicephalus is a species of plant in the family Cactaceae. It is endemic to Brazil.  Its natural habitats are subtropical or tropical dry shrubland and rocky areas. It is threatened by habitat loss.

Description
Micranthocereus albicephalus grows branching from the base with columnar, green shoots and reaches heights of growth of up to 2.5 meters. The shoots have a diameter of up to 9 centimeters. There are up to 22 ribs. The areoles, which are 3 to 5 millimeters apart, are covered with light yellow wool and white hair. Numerous straight, up to 15 millimeters long, thin, prickly, golden-yellow thorns arise from them, one of which points downwards. The 30 to 40 centimeters long and 8 to 9 centimeters wide cephalium consists of dense white wool and golden yellow bristles up to 6 centimeters long.

The companulated flowers are white and open at night. They are 4.5 to 5 centimeters long. The spherical fruits reach a diameter of 3 to 3.5 centimeters.

References

External links

Flora of Brazil
albicephalus
Near threatened plants
Taxonomy articles created by Polbot